The men's javelin throw event at the 2008 Summer Olympics took place on 21 and 23 August at the Beijing National Stadium. The qualification mark was set at 82.50 metres.

The qualifying standards were 81.80 m (268.37 ft) (A standard) and 77.80 m (255.25 ft) (B standard).

Schedule
All times are China standard time (UTC+8)

Records
Prior to the competition, the existing World and Olympic records were as follows.

The following new Olympic record was set during this competition:

Results

Qualifying round

Qualification: 82.50 (Q) or at least 12 best performers (q) advance to the final.

Final

References

Athletics at the 2008 Summer Olympics
Javelin throw at the Olympics
Men's events at the 2008 Summer Olympics